Manish Kaushik (Hindi: मनीष कौशिक Manīṣa Kauśika) is an Indian voice-dubbing artist, radio jockey and entertainer that can speak English, Hindi and Haryanvi as his mother tongue languages.

He has given the Hindi dubbing voice to Brandon in Season 4 of the Italian animated series, Winx Club.

Dubbing career
Kaushik has been dubbing for characters that are known to have light-hearted wise personalities. Usually Cheerful, rich, comedic, bright and upbeat characters. His voice tone ranges from Mid-range to deep. His voice is usually best suited for those with happy cheerful positive nature and authoritative attitudes. He actively does voiceover work for National Geographic Channel, National Geographic Wild, NDTV Good Times, UTV movies, TV commercials, Promotional Videos and many more.

Dubbing roles

Animated series

Live action films

See also
Dubbing (filmmaking)
List of Indian Dubbing Artists

References

Year of birth missing (living people)
Place of birth missing (living people)
Indian male voice actors
Living people
Male actors from Mumbai